Amarnath may refer to:

Places
 Amarnath Temple, is a holy Hindu shrine in Anantnag district, Jammu and Kashmir, India.
 Amarnath Peak, a mountain with a peak elevation of 5,186 metres (17,014 ft), in Ganderbal district of Kashmir, in the vicinity of Sonamarg
 Amarnath land transfer controversy

People

As a surname 
 Lala Amarnath (1911–2000), Indian Test cricketer
 Mohinder Amarnath (born 1950), Indian cricketer
 Surinder Amarnath (born 1948), Indian cricketer
 Gopi Amarnath, Indian cinematographer, who works in the Tamil film industry
 Palani Amarnath (born 1982), Indian cricketer
 K. Amarnath (1914–1983), Indian film producer and director
 Satish Amarnath, a Medical microbiologist associated with Manipal Hospitals

As a given name 
 Amar Nath (1909–1996), Indian classical vocalist
 Amarnath Sehgal (1922–2007), Indian sculptor, painter and poet, Padma Bhushan (2008)
 Amarnath Gami (born 1967), Indian politician
 Amarnath Pradhan (born 1958), Indian politician and member of Parliament
 Amarnath Vidyalankar (1901–1985), Indian freedom fighter, journalist, social worker and member of Parliament
 Amarnath Jha (died 1947), Vice Chancellor of University of Allahabad and Banaras Hindu University

Other 
 Amarnath Express, Indian Railways train that runs between Guwahati and Jammu Tawi in India
 Amarnath (film), a 1978 Kannada film

See also
 Amaranth (disambiguation)
 Amar (disambiguation)